Sampsa Astala, (born 23 January 1974), known by stage names Stala and Kita, is the lead singer of the Finnish glam rock band Stala & SO. and the former and original drummer for the metal band Lordi.

His current stage name, Stala, comes from his own surname, Astala. His other stage name, which he used during his time in Lordi and whenever appearing as drummer, Kita, comes from the Finnish word meaning "jaws", "gap", or "maw".

Career 
Sampsa Astala created Stala & SO. as SO, back in 1997. The band recorded a few albums and toured in Finland but Astala didn't have much time for Stala & SO anymore since he joined Lordi in 2000 as drummer. He arranged and performed all backing vocals on the Lordi albums, but could not sing live due to his massive mask. With the band Lordi he went on to win the 2006 Eurovision Song Contest. In recognition, the city of Karkkila, where he spent his teenage years, named its youth facilities after him.  Despite many critics wrongly accusing Lordi of being a satanic band, on the "Thank you to..." list on the Lordi albums, Kita thanks "Almighty God".

On 4 October 2010 there was an announcement from Lordi, saying that Kita no longer was a member. Further explanation told that his leaving was a joint decision between him and his bandmates, as Kita's increasing exposure as himself with Stala & So., rather than in costume as Kita, was "breaking the rules" of Lordi.

In end of 2010 it was announced that Stala & SO. would participate in Eurovision Song Contest 2011. On 23 November, the first promosingle of the new album was released, "Everything For Money". On 29 November, "Pamela", the song with which he would play in Eurovision stage was revealed through the YLE channel. On 28 January, they passed the semi final and they got "the card" for the final on 12 February. On 16 February their debut album, "It Is So.", was released.

Discography

Stala & SO. 
 It Is So. (2011)
 Gimme Five (2012)
 Play Another Round (2013)
 Stala & So. (2015)

Lordi 
 Get Heavy (2002)
 The Monsterican Dream (2004)
 The Arockalypse (2006)
 Deadache (2008)
 Babez for Breakfast  (2010)

Solo 
 Se ihan kiva jäbä (2022)

Other releases 

 Apulanta: Hiekka (2002) (backing vocals)
 Järjestyshäiriö: Levoton (EP) (2004) (producer, recorder, backing vocals)
 Hanna Pakarinen: Lovers (2007) (backing vocals)
 Pete Parkkonen : First Album (2009) (song writing)
 Naked Idol: Boys of Summer (2013) (drums)
 Naked Idol: Shattered (2013) (drums)
 Naked Idol: Filthy Fairies EP (2013) (drums on "Shattered" and "Filthy Fairies")

References 

Lordi members
Finnish rock drummers
Finnish heavy metal drummers
1974 births
Living people
Finnish Lutherans
People from Vantaa
Eurovision Song Contest winners
Eurovision Song Contest entrants of 2006
Eurovision Song Contest entrants for Finland
21st-century drummers